This is a list of Belgian television related events from 2010.

Events
28 May - Mega Mindy actor Louis Talpe and his partner Leila Akcelik win the fourth season of Sterren op de Dansvloer.

Debuts

New International Programming
13 November -  Lipstick Jungle (VIJFtv)

Television shows

1990s
Samson en Gert (1990–present)
Familie (1991–present)
Thuis (1995–present)

2000s
Idool (2003-2011)
Mega Mindy (2006–present)
Sterren op de Dansvloer (2006–2013)

Ending this year

Births

Deaths

See also
2010 in Belgium